Kautilya Vidyalaya is a higher secondary school in Mysore, Karnataka province, India.

History
The school was established in 2007 and got CBSE affiliation in 2008. The school is managed by J. Ranganna Lakshmamma Charitable Trust.

Facilities
The school was built in an area of two acres. There are laboratories and libraries for high school and junior college sections.

Grades
The school has grades from kindergarten to pre-university levels.

References

High schools and secondary schools in Mysore
Educational institutions established in 2007
2007 establishments in Karnataka